Nicola Zalewski (born 23 January 2002) is a Polish professional footballer who plays as a midfielder for Serie A club Roma. Born and raised in Italy to Polish parents, he plays for the Poland national team at international level.

Club career 
Zalewski made his professional debut for Roma on 6 May 2021 in the Europa League semi-final against Manchester United, replacing Pedro at the 76th minute and being instrumental to the winning goal, an own goal by Alex Telles, seven minutes later. He made his Serie A debut three days later, on 9 May, during a home game against Crotone. On 29 December, Roma announced his contract had been extended until 2025. On 28 February 2022, he first played as a starter for Roma in their 1–0 against Spezia.

International career 
Zalewski, while born in Italy, doesn't hold an Italian citizenship. He was first selected by the youth selections of the Poland national team after being discovered by Zbigniew Boniek, head of the Polish Football Association and former Roma player. He made his debut for the senior team on 5 September 2021, in the World Cup Qualifier against San Marino where he came on in 66th minute and assisted Adam Buksa in the 94th minute who made it 7–1 for Poland.

Personal life 
Zalewski was born in Tivoli to Polish parents and grew up in Poli. He has a sister, Jessica, born in 1992. His father, Krzysztof Zalewski, died on 24 September 2021.

Career statistics

Club

International

Honours

Club
Roma
UEFA Europa Conference League: 2021–22

Individual
Golden Boy Web: 2022

References

External links
 Profile at the A.S. Roma website
 

2002 births
Living people
People from Tivoli, Lazio
Sportspeople from the Metropolitan City of Rome Capital
Footballers from Lazio
Polish footballers
Association football midfielders
A.S. Roma players
Serie A players
2022 FIFA World Cup players
Poland youth international footballers
Poland under-21 international footballers
Poland international footballers
UEFA Europa Conference League winning players